Crveni spust is a World Cup slalom ski course at Medvednica mountain near Zagreb, Croatia, first opened in 1946 by the city.

This course is hosting World Cup slalom events since 2005 (women) and 2008 (men) for the Snow Queen Trophy competition.  

It is located just north of the peak Sljeme, whose sports facility maintenance organization manages the venue.

World Cup
It hosted total of 15 World Cup events for women (37th of all-time) and 12 World Cup events for men (34th of all-time).

Women's slalom

Men's slalom

Course sections
Filter, Flat, Finish Steep

References

External links
FIS Alpine Ski World Cup – Zagreb, Croatia
Ski-db.com - Zagreb women's races
Ski-db.com - Zagreb men's races

Skiing competitions in Europe
International sports competitions hosted by Croatia
Alpine skiing competitions
Sport in Zagreb
Recurring sporting events established in 2005
January sporting events
Alpine skiing in Croatia
Winter events in Croatia

fi:Crveni Spust